Hits 1979–1989  is a compilation album by American singer Rosanne Cash, released in 1989. It peaked at No. 8 on the Billboard Top Country Albums charts and No. 152 on The Billboard 200. In February 1995 the album was certified Gold by the RIAA.

Track listing

Personnel
Bobby Bare - background vocals
Eddie Bayers - drums
Barry Beckett - keyboards
Tony Brown - keyboards
James Burton - guitar
Rosemary Butler - background vocals
Rosanne Cash - lead vocals
John Cowan - background vocals
Larry Crane - guitar
Rodney Crowell - guitar, background vocals
Patricia Darcy - background vocals
Hank DeVito - steel guitar
Terry Evans - background vocals
Anton Fig - drums
Pat Flynn - guitar
Vince Gill - background vocals
Steve Goldstein - keyboards
Emory Gordy Jr. - bass guitar, guitar, keyboards
Willie Green Jr. - background vocals
Emmylou Harris - background vocals
Ula Hedwig - background vocals
David Hungate - bass guitar
Shane Keister - keyboards
Jennifer Kimball - background vocals
Bobby King - background vocals
Albert Lee - guitar
Paul Leim - drums
Maxayn Lewis - background vocals
Larrie Londin - drums
Randy McCormick - keyboards
Arnold McCuller - background vocals
Jerry McGee - guitar
Edgar Meyer - upright bass
Mark O'Connor - fiddle
Joe Osborne - bass guitar
Jim Photogolo - background vocals
Frank Reckard - guitar
Michael Rhodes - bass guitar
Robert Sabino - keyboards
Randy Scruggs - guitar
Ricky Skaggs - fiddle, guitar
Steuart Smith - guitar
Harry Stinson - background vocals
Benmont Tench - keyboards
Waddy Wachtel - guitar
Billy Joe Walker Jr. - guitar
John Ware - drums 
Willie Weeks - bass guitar
Reggie Young - guitar

Charts

Weekly charts

Year-end charts

References

1989 compilation albums
Rosanne Cash albums
Albums produced by David Malloy
Albums produced by Rodney Crowell
Columbia Records compilation albums